These are the front benches of Eamon Gilmore from 2007 until 2011, before he became Tánaiste. Gilmore led the Labour Party between 2007 and 2014. He was confirmed unopposed as leader on 6 September 2007, succeeding Pat Rabbitte.

Initial front bench
This was announced in 2007.

 Eamon Gilmore - Party Leader
 Emmet Stagg - Chief Whip
 Joe Costello - Spokesperson on European Affairs, Defence and Assistant Party Whip
 Proinsias De Rossa  Vice-President, European Socialist Group
 Joan Burton - Spokesperson on Finance
 Brendan Howlin - Spokesperson on Constitutional Matters and Law Reform
 Pat Rabbitte - Spokesperson on Justice
 Brian O'Shea - Spokesperson on Defence and the Irish language
 Willie Penrose - Spokesperson on Enterprise, Trade and Employment
 Jan O'Sullivan - Spokesperson on Health
 Ruairi Quinn - Spokesperson on Education and Science
 Dominic Hannigan - Spokesperson on Commuter Issues; Crime and Policing; Environment and Climate Change; Community and Rural Affairs 
 Michael D. Higgins - Spokesperson on Foreign Affairs
 Tommy Broughan - Spokesperson on Transport
 Alan Kelly - Spokesperson on Tourism; Finance; Local Government
 Ciarán Lynch - Spokesperson on Housing and Local Government 
 Kathleen Lynch - Spokesperson on Disability Issues and Equality
 Michael McCarthy - Spokesperson on Communications, Energy and Natural Resources; Marine; Agriculture and Food
 Liz McManus - Spokesperson on Communications, Energy and
 Phil Prendergast - Spokesperson on Health; Arts and Sports; Social and Family Affairs
 Brendan Ryan - Spokesperson on Consumer Affairs; Education and Science; Transport; Defence
 Séan Sherlock - Spokesperson on Agriculture and Food
 Roisin Shortall - Spokesperson on Social and Family Affairs
 Joanna Tuffy - Spokesperson on Environment and Heritage
 Mary Upton - Spokesperson on Arts, Sport and Tourism 
 Jack Wall - Spokesperson on Community and Rural Affairs
 Alex White - Seanad Group Leader and Spokesperson on Children; Foreign Affairs; Northern Ireland; Enterprise, Trade and Employment; Equality and Immigration

References

2007 establishments in Ireland
2007 in Irish politics
2011 disestablishments in Ireland
Gilmore
Labour Party (Ireland)